Stenocercus carrioni, Parker's whorltail iguana, is a species of lizard of the Tropiduridae family. It is found in Ecuador.

References

Stenocercus
Reptiles described in 1934
Endemic fauna of Ecuador
Reptiles of Ecuador
Taxa named by Hampton Wildman Parker